The moroccan census of the population, officially named general census of the population and the habitat (RGPH), is a census taking place every ten years in the kingdom. It is established under the responsibility of the High Commissioner for Planning.

History 
In Morocco under French protectorate or Spanish protectorate, counts were made, spreading irregularly from 1921 to 1951.

In 1960 (under Mohammed V), soon after the found independence, was carried out the first demographic census proper of the country. Five others followed, separated by nearly ten years then ten years: in 1971, 1982 and 1994 (under Hassan II), then in 2004 and 2014 (under Mohammed VI); thus, since the 2000s, the national population census, entitled "general census of the population and the habitat" (RGHP), took a "cruising speed" strictly decennial.

See also
 2014 Moroccan census
 Demographics of Morocco

References 

Censuses in Morocco
Census